The Archdiocese of Taunggyi is a particular church of the Roman Catholic Church located in the Shan State of Myanmar. The dioceses of Kengtung, Loikaw, Pekhon and Taungngu are suffragans of the archdiocese. The cathedral of the archdiocese is St. Joseph's Cathedral in Taunggyi.

The diocese of Taunggyi was created on March 21, 1961 by splitting from the diocese of Taungoo, and was a suffragan of the Archdiocese of Yangon. When the diocese was elevated to become an archdiocese and metropolitan see on January 17, 1998, Kentung (from Mandalay) and Loikaw and Taungoo (from Yangon) were assigned to the new ecclesiastical province. The Diocese of Pekhon was created on December 15, 2005 by splitting off the southern part of the archdiocese.

After the split, the archdiocese has 7,350 Catholics out of a total population of 1.5 million. It is subdivided into 12 parishes, and has a total number of 25 priests.

Bishops
Basilio Athai, since June 24, 2016, had been auxiliary bishop since June 28, 2008
Matthias U Shwe, December 18, 1989 - April 12, 2015 (retired), had been auxiliary bishop since December 20, 1979, died August 12, 2021 
Giovanni Battista Gobbato, P.I.M.E., March 21, 1961 - December 18, 1989 (retired)

Auxiliary bishops
Peter Hla, auxiliary bishop from March 13, 2001 till December 15, 2005 (became bishop of Pekhon)
Basilio Athai, auxiliary bishop since July 1, 2008

References

External links
Catholic-hierarchy.org
 Notes on creation of the episcopal province of Taunggyi

Roman Catholic dioceses in Burma
Christian organizations established in 1961
Roman Catholic dioceses and prelatures established in the 20th century
1961 establishments in Burma